The 1st Infantry Division is a combined arms division of the United States Army, and is the oldest continuously serving division in the Regular Army. It has seen continuous service since its organization in 1917 during World War I. It was officially nicknamed "The Big Red One" (abbreviated "BRO") after its shoulder patch and is also nicknamed "The Fighting First." The division has also received troop monikers of "The Big Dead One" and "The Bloody First" as puns on the respective officially sanctioned nicknames. It is currently based at Fort Riley, Kansas.

World War I
A few weeks after the American entry into World War I, the First Expeditionary Division, later designated the 1st Infantry Division, was constituted on 24 May 1917, in the Regular Army, and was organized on 8 June 1917, at Fort Jay, on Governors Island in New York harbor under the command of Brigadier General William L. Sibert, from Army units then in service on the Mexico–United States border and at various Army posts throughout the United States. The original table of organization and equipment (TO&E) included two organic infantry brigades of two infantry regiments each, one engineer battalion; one signal battalion; one trench mortar battery; one field artillery brigade of three field artillery regiments; one air squadron; and a full division train. The total authorized strength of this TO&E was 18,919 officers and enlisted men. George S. Patton, who served as the first headquarters commandant for the American Expeditionary Forces, oversaw much of the arrangements for the movement of the 1st Division to France, and their organization in-country. Frank W. Coe, who later served as Chief of Coast Artillery, was the division's first chief of staff.

The first units sailed from New York City and Hoboken, New Jersey, on 14 June 1917. Throughout the remainder of the year, the rest of the division followed, landing at St. Nazaire, France, and Liverpool, England. After a brief stay in rest camps, the troops in England proceeded to France, landing at Le Havre. The last unit arrived in St. Nazaire 22 December. Upon arrival in France, the division, less its artillery, was assembled in the First (Gondrecourt) training area, and the artillery was at Le Valdahon.

On 4 July, the 2nd Battalion, 16th Infantry, paraded through the streets of Paris to bolster the sagging French spirits. An apocryphal story holds that at Lafayette's tomb, to the delight of the attending Parisians, Captain Charles E. Stanton of the division's 16th Infantry Regiment stepped forward and declared, "Lafayette, nous sommes ici! [Lafayette, we are here!]" Two days later, 6 July, Headquarters, First Expeditionary Division was redesignated as Headquarters, First Division, American Expeditionary Forces.

On 8 August 1917, the 1st Division adopted the "square" Table of Organization and Equipment (TO&E), which specified two organic infantry brigades of two infantry regiments each; one engineer regiment; one signal battalion; one machine gun battalion; one field artillery brigade of three field artillery regiments, and a complete division train. The total authorized strength of this new TO&E was 27,120 officers and enlisted men.

On the morning of 23 October, the first American shell of the war was fired toward German lines by a First Division artillery unit. Two days later, the 2nd Battalion of the 16th Infantry suffered the first American casualties of the war.

By April 1918, the German Army had pushed to within  of Paris. In reaction to this thrust, the division moved into the Picardy Sector to bolster the exhausted French First Army. To the division's front lay the small village of Cantigny, situated on the high ground overlooking a forested countryside. The 28th Infantry Regiment attacked the town, and within 45 minutes captured it along with 250 German soldiers. It was the first American victory of the war. The 28th was thereafter named the "Black Lions of Cantigny."

Soissons was taken by the 1st Division in July 1918. The Soissons victory was costly – 700 men were killed or wounded. (One of them, Private Francis Lupo of Cincinnati, was missing in action for 85 years, until his remains were discovered on the former battlefield in 2003). The 1st Division took part in the first offensive by an American army in the war, and helped to clear the Saint-Mihiel salient by fighting continuously from 11 to 13 September 1918. The last major World War I battle was fought in the Meuse-Argonne Forest. The division advanced a total of seven kilometers and defeated, in whole or part, eight German divisions. This victory was mainly due to the efforts of George C. Marshall, who began the war as the division's Deputy Chief of Staff before being elevated to G-3 for the entire AEF in July 1918. Combat operations ended with the implementation of the terms of the Armistice on 11 November 1918. At the time the division was at Sedan, the farthest American penetration of the war, and was the first to cross the Rhine into occupied Germany.

By the end of the war, the division had suffered 4,964 killed in action, 17,201 wounded in action, and 1,056 missing or died of wounds. Five division soldiers received Medals of Honor.

The division's dog-mascot was a mixed breed terrier known as Rags. Rags was adopted by the division in 1918 and remained its mascot until his death in 1936. Rags achieved notoriety and celebrity as a war dog, after saving many lives in the crucial Argonne Campaign by delivering a vital message despite being bombed and gassed.

Order of battle

Assigned units

Headquarters, 1st Division
1st Infantry Brigade
 16th Infantry Regiment
18th Infantry Regiment
 2nd Machine Gun Battalion
 2nd Infantry Brigade
 26th Infantry Regiment
 28th Infantry Regiment
 3rd Machine Gun Battalion
1st Field Artillery Brigade
 5th Field Artillery Regiment (155 mm)
 6th Field Artillery Regiment (75 mm)
 7th Field Artillery Regiment (75 mm)
 1st Trench Mortar Battery
 1st Machine Gun Battalion
 1st Engineer Regiment
 2nd Field Signal Battalion
 Headquarters Troop, 1st Division
 1st Train Headquarters and Military Police
 1st Ammunition Train
 1st Supply Train
 1st Engineer Train
1st Sanitary Train 
 2nd, 3rd, 12th, and 13th Ambulance Companies and Field Hospitals)
1st Military Police Company, 1st Infantry Division.

Attached units

En route to France and in 1st (Gondrecourt) Training Area 
(as of 9 June – 23 September 1917)
 5th Regiment USMC

Ménil-la-Tour Area 28 February – 3 April 1918 
 1st Battalion, 2nd Engineers (2nd Division)

Cantigny Sector, at times from 27 April to 7 July 1918 
 French 228th Field Artillery Regiment (75 mm)
 French 253d Field Artillery Regiment (75 mm)
 1st and 2nd Battalions of the French 258th Field Artillery Regiment (75 mm)
 4th Battalion, Fr 301st Artillery Regiment (155 mm)
 One battery, French 3rd Cl Artillery Regiment (155 mm)
 3rd and 4th Battalions, French 284th Artillery Regiment (220 mm)
 2nd Battalion, French 289th Artillery Regiment (220 mm)
 One battery, Fr 3d Cl Artillery Regiment (220 mm)
 6th Battalion, Fr 289th Artillery Regiment (280 mm)
 Two batteries Fr TM (58 mm)
 One battery Fr TM (150 mm)
 One battery Fr TM (240 mm)
 Fr 5th Tank Battalion (12 tanks)

Aisne-Marne Operation
(as of 18–23 July 1918)
 Fr 42d Aero Sq
 Fr 83d Bln Company
 Fr 253d FA-Portée (75 mm)
 Fr 11th and 12th Groups of Tanks

Saizerais Sector
(as of 8–24 August 1918)
 Fr 258th Aero Sq
 6th and 7th Bln Companies
 3 batteries Fr 247th FA- Portée
 Preceding and during the Saint-Mihiel Operation, at times from 8–14 September 1918
 8th Observation Sq
 9th Bln Company
 58th Field Artillery Brigade and 108th Am Tn (33d Division)
 76th Field Artillery (3d Division) (75 mm)
 Two batteries, 44th CA (8")
 Troops D, F, and H, 2nd Cavalry
 Two platoons, Company A, 1st Gas Regiment (Eight mortars)
 Two infantry battalions (42nd Division)
 6th Infantry Brigade (3nd Division)
 Two companies, 51st Pioneer Infantry
 7th MG Battalion (3d Division)
 49 tanks of 1st Tank Brigade

Meuse-Argonne Operation 
(as of 1–2 October 1918)
 60th Field Artillery Brigade
 110th Am Tn (35th Division)
(as of 1–12 October 1918)
 1st Aero Squadron
 2d Bln Company
 Fr 219th Field Artillery (75 mm)
 Fr 247th Field Artillery (6 batteries 75 mm)
 Fr 5th Battalion 282d Artillery (220 mm)
 Provisional Squadron, 2d Cavalry
 Company C, 1st Gas Regiment
 Company C, 344th Tank Battalion, 1st Tank Brigade (16 tanks)
 Companies B and C, 345th Tank Battalion, 1st Tank Brigade (16 tanks)
(as of 7 October 1918)
 362d Infantry (91st Division)
(as of 8–11 October 1918)
 181st Infantry Brigade (91st Division)

Coblenz Bridgehead 
 14th Bln Company (18–30 June 1919)
 MG elements, Fr 2d Cavalry Division (18–30 June 1919)
 4th MG Battalion (2d Division) 18–29 June 1919
 7th MG Battalion (3d Division) 20–30 June 1919

Detached service

 At Le Valdahon 22 August – 18 October 1917 with 15th (Scottish) Division during the Second Battle of the Aisne, 24 July 1918 with U.S. 90th Division
 1st Field Artillery Brigade
 1st Am Tn
 With the 15th (Scottish) Division during Aisne-Marne Operation 24 July 1918 in Saizerais (Villers-en-Haye) Sector 24–28 August 1918;with 42nd Division in Meuse-Argonne Operation 13–31 October 1918;with 2nd Division in Meuse-Argonne Operation 1–4 November 1918.
 1st Sn Tn
 With III Corps 28 September – 2 October 1918
 1st Engineers
 With American forces in Germany after 9 August 1919.
 2d, 6th Field Artillery
 Company A, 1st Engineers
 Companies A, B, C, D, 1st Sup Tn
 F Hosp 13

Interwar period

The 1st Division returned to the continental U.S. in September 1919, demobilized its war-time TO&E at Camp Zachary Taylor at Louisville, Kentucky, and then returned to New York, with its headquarters located at Fort Hamilton in Brooklyn.

On 7 October 1920, the 1st Division organized under the peacetime TO&E, which included two organic infantry brigades of two infantry regiments each, one engineer regiment; one observation squadron; one field artillery brigade of two field artillery regiments; one medical regiment; one division quartermaster train; and a special troops command replacing the remainder of the division train. The total authorized strength of this TO&E was 19,385. 1st Division was one of three infantry divisions and one cavalry division that was authorized to remain at full peacetime strength. It was the only Regular Army division assigned to the Second Corps Area, which also included the 27th Infantry Division of the New York National Guard; the 44th Infantry Division of the New Jersey, New York, and Delaware National Guards; the 21st Cavalry Division of the New York, Pennsylvania, Rhode Island, and New Jersey National Guards; and the 77th, 78th, and 98th Infantry Divisions and the 61st Cavalry Division of the Organized Reserves. This was the organization that existed in the Second Corps Area for the duration of the Interbellum period.

1st Division adopted a new peacetime TO&E in preparation for war on 8 January 1940, which included three infantry regiments, one military police company, one engineer battalion, one signal company, one light field artillery regiment of three field artillery battalions and one medium field artillery regiment of two field artillery battalions, one medical battalion, and one quartermaster battalion. The authorized strength of this TO&E was 9,057 officers and enlisted men. 1st Infantry Division reorganized again on 1 November 1940 to a new TO&E, which added a reconnaissance troop, and organized the two field artillery regiments into a division artillery command, and beefed up the strength to a total authorized strength of 15,245 officers and enlisted men.

World War II

Order of battle

 Headquarters, 1st Infantry Division
16th Infantry Regiment
18th Infantry Regiment
26th Infantry Regiment
 Headquarters and Headquarters Battery, 1st Infantry Division Artillery
 5th Field Artillery Battalion (155 mm)
 7th Field Artillery Battalion (105 mm)
 32nd Field Artillery Battalion (105 mm)
 33rd Field Artillery Battalion (105 mm)
 1st Engineer Combat Battalion
 1st Medical Battalion
 1st Cavalry Reconnaissance Troop (Mechanized)
 Headquarters, Special Troops, 1st Infantry Division
 Headquarters Company, 1st Infantry Division
 701st Ordnance Light Maintenance Company
 1st Quartermaster Company
 1st Signal Company
 Military Police Platoon
 Band
 1st Counterintelligence Corps Detachment
103rd Anti-Aircraft Artillery Battalion (Automatic Weapons)

Combat chronicle

Shortly after the German invasion of Poland, beginning World War II in Europe, the 1st Infantry Division, under Major General Walter Short, was moved to Fort Benning, Georgia, on 19 November 1939 where it supported the U.S. Army Infantry School as part of American mobilization preparations. It then moved to the Sabine Parish, Louisiana area on 11 May 1940 to participate in the Louisiana Maneuvers. The division next relocated to Fort Hamilton, Brooklyn on 5 June 1940, where it spent over six months before moving to Fort Devens, Massachusetts, on 4 February 1941. As part of its training that year, the division participated in both Carolina Maneuvers of October and November before returning to Fort Devens, Massachusetts on 6 December 1941.

A day later, on 7 December 1941, the Japanese attacked Pearl Harbor and, four days later, Germany declared war on the United States, thus bringing the United States into the conflict. The division was ordered to Camp Blanding, Florida, as quickly as trains could be gathered and winter weather permitted, and arrived on 21 February 1942. The division, now under Major General Donald C. Cubbison, was there reorganized and refurbished with new equipment, being re-designated as the 1st Infantry Division on 15 May 1942. Within a week, the division was returned to its former post at Fort Benning, Georgia, from where it was expedited on 21 June 1942 to Indiantown Gap Military Reservation for wartime overseas deployment final preparation. The division, now under the command of Major General Terry Allen, a distinguished World War I veteran, departed the New York Port of Embarkation on 1 August 1942, arrived in Beaminster in south-west England about a week later, and departed 22 October 1942 for the combat amphibious assault of North Africa.

As part of II Corps, the division landed in Oran, Algeria on 8 November 1942 as part of Operation Torch, the Allied invasion of French North Africa. Elements of the division then took part in combat at Maktar, Tebourba, Medjez el Bab, the Battle of Kasserine Pass (where American forces were pushed back), and Gafsa. It then led the Allied assault in brutal fighting at El Guettar, Béja, and Mateur. The 1st Infantry Division was in combat in the Tunisian Campaign from 21 January 1943 to 9 May 1943, helping secure Tunisia. The campaign ended just days later, with the surrender of almost 250,000 Axis soldiers. After months of nearly continuous fighting, the division had a short rest before training for the next operation.

In July 1943, the division took part in the Allied invasion of Sicily, codenamed Operation Husky, still under the command of Major General Allen. Lieutenant General George S. Patton, commanding the U.S. Seventh Army, specifically requested the division as part of his forces for the invasion of Sicily. It was still assigned to the II Corps. In Sicily the 1st Division saw heavy action when making amphibious landings opposed by Italian and German tanks at the Battle of Gela. The 1st Division then moved up through the center of Sicily, slogging it out through the mountains along with the 45th Infantry Division. In these mountains, the division saw some of the heaviest fighting in the entire Sicilian campaign at the Battle of Troina; some units losing more than half their strength in assaulting the mountain town. On 7 August 1943, Major General Allen was relieved of his command by Lieutenant General Omar Bradley, then commanding the II Corps. Allen was replaced by Major General Clarence R. Huebner who was, like Allen, a decorated veteran of World War I who had served with the 1st Infantry Division throughout the war.

When that campaign was over, the division returned to England, arriving there on 5 November 1943 to prepare for the eventual invasion of Normandy. One regimental combat team of 1st Infantry Division and one regimental combat team from the 29th Infantry Division as well as A,B,C companies of the 2nd Rangers Battalion and the 5th Rangers Battalion comprised the first wave of troops that assaulted German Army defenses on Omaha Beach on D-Day. The division had to run 300 yards to get to the bluffs, with some of the division's units suffering 30 percent casualties in the first hour of the assault, and secured Formigny and Caumont in the beachhead by the end of the day. The division followed up the Saint-Lô break-through with an attack on Marigny, 27 July 1944.

The division then drove across France in a continuous offensive. It took large numbers of prisoners during the Battle of the Mons Pocket, and reached the German border at Aachen in September. The division laid siege to Aachen, taking the city after a direct assault on 21 October 1944. The 1st Division then attacked east of Aachen through the Hürtgen Forest, driving to the Ruhr, and was moved to a rear area 7 December 1944 for refitting and rest following 6 months of combat. When the German Wacht Am Rhein offensive (commonly called the Battle of the Bulge) was launched on 16 December 1944, the division, now commanded by Major General Clift Andrus, was quickly moved to the Ardennes front. Fighting continuously from 17 December 1944 to 28 January 1945, the division helped to blunt and reverse the German offensive. Thereupon, the division, now commanded by Major General Clift Andrus, attacked and again breached the Siegfried Line, fought across the Ruhr, 23 February 1945, and drove on to the Rhine, crossing at the Remagen bridgehead, 15–16 March. The division broke out of the bridgehead, took part in the encirclement of the Ruhr Pocket, captured Paderborn, pushed through the Harz Mountains, and was in Czechoslovakia, fighting at Kynšperk nad Ohří, Prameny, and Mnichov (Domažlice District) when the war in Europe ended. Sixteen members of the division were awarded the Medal of Honor during World War II.

Casualties

Total battle casualties: 20,659 (15,374 in Europe, 5,285 in North Africa and Sicily)
Killed in action: 3,616 (2,713 in Europe, 903 in North Africa and Sicily)
Wounded in action: 15,208 (11,527 in Europe, 3,681 in North Africa and Sicily)
Missing in action: 499 (329 in Europe, 170 in North Africa and Sicily)
Prisoner of war: 1,336 (805 in Europe, 531 in North Africa and Sicily)
Days of Combat: 443

Awards and prisoners taken
 Distinguished Unit Citation:
 Company K, 18th Infantry Regiment, for action in combat on 23 March 1943 (War Department General Order No. 60, 1944)
 32nd Field Artillery Battalion, for action in combat from 21–24 March 1943 (War Department General Order No. 66, 1945)
 2nd Battalion, 18th Infantry Regiment, for action in combat on 23 April 1943 (War Department General Order No. 4, 1945)
 1st Battalion, 16th Infantry Regiment, for action in combat from 29–30 April 1943 (War Department General Order No. 60, 1944)
 2nd Battalion, 16th Infantry Regiment, for action in combat from 10–13 July 1943 (War Department General Order No. 60, 1944)
 1st Battalion, 16th Infantry Regiment, for action in combat from 10–14 July 1943 (War Department General Order No. 60, 1944)
 Cannon Company, 16th Infantry Regiment, for action in combat from 11–13 July 1943 (War Department General Order No. 60, 1944)
 16th Infantry Regiment, for action in combat on 6 June 1944 (War Department General Order No. 73, 1944)
 18th Infantry Regiment, for action in combat from 6–16 June 1944 (War Department General Order No. 14, 1945)
 1st Battalion, 26th Infantry Regiment, for action in combat from 13–22 September 1944 (War Department General Order No. 42, 1945)
 18th Infantry Regiment, for action in combat from 8–10 October 1944 (War Department General Order No. 42, 1945)
 3rd Battalion, 18th Infantry Regiment, for action in combat from 8–19 October 1944 (War Department General Order No. 30, 1945)
 Companies G and L, 16th Infantry Regiment, for action in combat from 15–17 October 1944 (War Department General Order No. 14, 1945)
 1st Battalion, 16th Infantry Regiment, for action in combat from 16–19 November 1944 (War Department General Order No. 120, 1946)
 2nd Battalion, 16th Infantry Regiment, for action in combat from 18–26 November 1944 (War Department General Order No. 120, 1946)
 3rd Battalion, 16th Infantry Regiment, for action in combat from 16–26 November 1944 (War Department General Order No. 120, 1946)
 Company F, 18th Infantry Regiment, for action in combat on 2 February 1945 (War Department General Order No. 29, 1946)
Medal of Honor: 16
DSC: 131
Legion of Merit: 16
Silver Star: 4,258
Soldiers Medal: 100
Bronze Star: 12,568
Air Medal: 65
Prisoners taken: 188,382
Days of Combat: 443

Assignments in European and North African theaters
 1 February 1943: II Corps, British First Army, 18th Army Group
 July 1943: US II Corps, U.S. Seventh Army, 15th Army Group
 1 November 1943: US First Army.
 6 November 1943: VII Corps.
 2 February 1944: V Corps, First Army, British 21st Army Group
 14 July 1944: US First Army.
 15 July 1944: VII Corps.
 1 August 1944: VII Corps, First Army, 12th Army Group.
 16 December 1944: V Corps.
 20 December 1944: Attached, with the entire First Army, to the British 21st Army Group.
 26 January 1945: XVIII Airborne Corps, First Army, 12th Army Group.
 12 February 1945: III Corps.
 8 March 1945: VII Corps.
 27 April 1945: VIII Corps.
 30 April 1945: V Corps.
 6 May 1945: United States Third Army, 12th Army Group.

Cold War

Korean War
During the Korean War, the Big Red One was assigned to occupation duty in Germany, while acting as a strategic deterrent against Soviet designs on Europe. 1st Infantry Division troops secured the Nuremberg War Crimes Trials and later transported seven convicted Nazi war criminals to Spandau Prison in Berlin.

In 1955, the division colors left Germany and were relocated to Fort Riley, Kansas.

1950s–1970s
Following its return from Germany, the 1st Infantry Division established headquarters at Fort Riley, Kansas. Its troops reorganized and trained for war at Fort Riley and at other posts.
In 1962 and 1963, four 1st Infantry Division Pentomic battle groups (2nd Battle Group, 12th Infantry; 1st Battle Group, 13th Infantry; 1st Battle Group, 28th Infantry; and 2d Battle Group, 26th Infantry) rotated, in turn, to West Berlin, Germany to augment the U.S. Army's Berlin Brigade during an international crisis initiated by construction of the Berlin Wall. These "Long Thrust Operations" were the most significant deployments conducted by 1st Infantry Division troops during the Cold War, placing Big Red One troops in confrontation with hostile communist forces.

From President Kennedy's approval on 25 May 1961, the Army divisions began to convert to the "Reorganization Objective Army Division 1965" (ROAD) structure in early 1962. While the bulk of the division was moved to Fort Riley in April 1970 (the colors returning to Kansas from Vietnam) replacing the inactivated 24th Infantry Division, its 3d Brigade, the Division Forward replacement component of REFORGER for the inactivated 24th Infantry Division, a mixture of cavalry and infantry, was forward-deployed to Germany. The brigade was initially stationed at Sheridan Kaserne, Augsburg, later moving to Cooke Barracks in Göppingen, with four battalions (two infantry, two armor) and the 1st Squadron, 4th Cavalry stationed in Stuttgart/Boeblingen (Panzer Kaserne) and the field artillery battalion in Neu Ulm (Wiley Kaserne) with the 1st Battalion, 26th Infantry in Göppingen and the 3d Battalion, 63d Armor in Augsburg. The Division Forward was inactivated on 15 August 1991 and the Big Red One became a two-brigade division with an assigned National Guard "roundout" brigade.

Vietnam War

The division fought in the Vietnam War from 1965 to 1970.
Arriving in July 1965, the division began combat operations within two weeks. By the end of 1965 the division had participated in three major operations: Hump, Bushmaster 1 and Bushmaster II, under the command of MG Jonathan O. Seaman.

In 1966, the division took part in Operation Marauder, Operation Crimp II and Operation Rolling Stone, all in the early part of the year. In March, Major General William E. DePuy took command. In June and July the division took part in the battles of Ap Tau O, Srok Dong and Minh Thanh Road. In November 1966, the division participated in Operation Attleboro.

1967 saw the division in Operation Cedar Falls, Operation Junction City, Operation Manhattan, Operation Billings, and Operation Shenandoah II. MG John H. Hay assumed command in February. On 17 June 1967, during Operation Billings, the division suffered 185 casualties, 35 killed and 150 wounded in the battle of Xom Bo II. Three months later on 17 October 1967, the 1st I.D suffered heavy casualties at the Battle of Ong Thanh with 58 killed.

The division was involved in the Tet Offensive of 1968, securing the massive Tan Son Nhut Air Base. In March, MG Keith L. Ware took command. That same month the division took part in Operation Quyet Thang ("Resolve to Win") and in April the division participated in the largest operation of the Vietnam War, Operation Toan Thang ("Certain Victory"). On 13 September Ware was killed in action when his command helicopter was shot down by enemy anti-aircraft fire during the Battle of Lộc Ninh. MG Orwin C. Talbott moved up from his position of assistant division commander to assume command of the division.

In the first half of 1969, The Big Red One conducted reconnaissance-in-force and ambush operations, including a multi-divisional operation, Atlas Wedge. The last part of the year saw the division take part in Dong Tien ("Progress Together") operations. These operations were intended to assist South Vietnamese forces to take a more active role in combat. In August, MG A. E. Milloy took command of the 1st I.D. while the division took part in battles along National Highway 13, known as "Thunder Road" to the end of the year.

In January 1970 it was announced that the division would return to Fort Riley. The division officially departed South Vietnam on 7 April 1970, when the division commander Brigadier General John Q. Henion, left Bien Hoa Air Base and returned the colors to Fort Riley. 11 members of the division were awarded the Medal of Honor. During its involvement in the Vietnam war, the division lost 6,146 killed in action, with a further 16,019 wounded. Twenty of its number were taken as prisoners-of-war.

Order of Battle in Vietnam

1st Brigade, 1st Inf Div Oct 1965 – Apr 1970

1st Bn/16th Inf Oct 1965 – Nov 1966
1st Bn/28th Inf Oct 1965 – Apr 1970
2nd Bn/28th Inf Oct 1965 – Nov 1966
1st Bn/2nd Inf Dec 1966 – Apr 1970
1st Bn/26th Inf Dec 1966 – Jan 1970
2nd Bn(M)/2nd Inf Feb 1970 – Apr 1970
2nd Bn/28th Inf [2] Feb 1970 – Apr 1970
1st Bn/5th Art (105mm How) DS 1st Bde Oct 1965 – Apr 1970

2nd Brigade, 1st Inf Div Jul 1965 – Apr 1970

2nd Bn/16th Inf Jul 1965 – Apr 1970
1st Bn/18th Inf Jul 1965 – Jan 1970
2nd Bn/18th Inf Jul 1965 – Apr 1970
1st Bn(M)/16th Inf Feb 1970 – Apr 1970
1st Bn/7th Art (105mm How) DS 2nd Bde Oct 1965* – Apr 1970
 Thus, the brigade had no artillery battalion for the period Jul – Sep 1965.

3rd Brigade, 1st Inf Div Oct 1965 – Apr 1970

1st Bn/2nd Inf Oct 1965 – Nov 1966
2nd Bn/2nd Inf Oct 1965 – Feb 1969 mechanized by Jan 1965
1st Bn/26th Inf Oct 1965 – Nov 1966
1st Bn/16th Inf Dec 1966 – Jan 1970 mechanized ca Oct 1968
2nd Bn/28th Inf Dec 1966 – Jan 1970
2nd Bn(M)/2nd Inf [2] Apr 1969 – Jan 1970
1st Bn/18th Inf Feb 1970 – Apr 1970
1st Bn/26th Inf Feb 1970 – Apr 1970
2nd Bn/33rd Art (105mm How) DS 3rd Bde Oct 1965 – Apr 1970

2nd Bn (M)/2nd Inf with 1st Cavalry Division Mar 1969

REFORGER

The division participated in REFORGER (Return of Forces in Germany) in all years. REFORGER was the largest set of NATO ground maneuvers since the end of World War II. The group performed surveillance on the border of Czechoslovakia and Germany during the Cold War.

Post-Cold War era

First Gulf War
The division, commanded by Major General Thomas G. Rhame, also participated in Operation Desert Storm. The division's two maneuver brigades from Fort Riley were rounded out by the addition of two tank battalions (2nd and 3rd, 66th Armor), an infantry battalion (1-41st Infantry), and a field artillery battalion (4-3 FA) from 2nd Armored Division (Forward) in Germany. The division played a significant role in the Battle of Norfolk. Specific combat arms and combat support units of the 3rd Battalion, 37th Armor and others were responsible for the initial breach of the Iraqi defenses providing subsequent passages for the rest of VII Corps, consequently rolling over the Iraqi 26th Infantry Division and taking 2,600 prisoners of war. These combat operations resulted in the destruction of 50 enemy tanks, 139 APCs, 30 air defense systems, 152 artillery pieces, 27 missile launchers, 108 mortars, and 548 wheeled vehicles, 61 trench lines and bunker positions, 92 dug in and open infantry targets, and 34 logistical sites. By the early morning of 28 February 1991, the division had taken position along the "Highway of Death", preventing any Iraqi retreat. The division's HHC, Alpha, Bravo, Charlie and Delta 3/37 Armor, HHC, Alpha, Bravo, Charlie and Delta 4/37 Armor, and 1st Squadron, 4th Cavalry Regiment (1/4 CAV), was then tasked with securing the town of Safwan, Iraq, and the airfield there where the Iraqis were later forced to sign the surrender agreement.

Valorous Unit citation:

There was also the "bulldozer assault", wherein the 1st and 2nd Brigades from the 1st Infantry Division (Mechanized) used mine plows mounted on tanks and combat earthmovers to bury Iraqi soldiers defending the fortified "Saddam Line." While approximately 2,000 men surrendered, escaping death, one newspaper story reported that U.S. commanders estimated thousands of Iraqi soldiers had been buried alive during the two-day assault over period 24–25 February 1991.

In 1996 the division colors were relocated to the German city of Würzburg (replacing the 3rd Infantry Division, which had relocated to Fort Stewart, GA). The division would remain in Germany until 2006, when the colors were struck and moved (again) to Fort Riley, Kansas.

Balkans

The divisional cavalry squadron, 1st Squadron 4th US Cavalry deployed to Bosnia as part of the initial IFOR mission from January to December 1996. The Squadron was based in Camp Alicia near the town of Kalesija. 2nd (Dagger) Brigade Combat Team deployed to Bosnia as part of IFOR (and subsequent SFOR) from October 1996 to April 1997. 2nd Brigade was replaced by elements from the 3rd Brigade and the division's aviation brigade. Units from the 1st (Devil) Brigade Combat Team also deployed to Bosnia as part of SFOR6 ("Operation Joint Forge") from August 1999 to April 2000.

Elements of the division, to include personnel and units from the 2nd, 3rd and aviation brigades, served in Kosovo. During the Kosovo War three soldiers were captured by Serbian forces but were later released after peace talks.

Units of the 1st Infantry Division served in Kosovo as part of the NATO-led Kosovo Force (KFOR) 1A and KFOR 1B from June 1999 to June 2000, then again for KFOR 4A and 4B from May 2002 to July 2003.

Iraq 2003 and 2004 

In January 2003, the division headquarters deployed to Turkey to command and control Army Forces Turkey (ARFOR-T) with a mission to receive and move the 4th Infantry Division across Turkey and into Northern Iraq. The task organization included HHC Division, 1–4 Cavalry, 1–26 Infantry, 1–6 Field Artillery, 2-1 Aviation, HHC Engineer Brigade, 9th Engineers, HHC DISCOM, 701 Main Support Battalion, 601 Aviation Support Battalion, 4-3 Air Defense Artillery, 101 Military Intelligence Battalion, 121 Signal Battalion, 12th Chemical Company, and other US Army Europe units to include the Theater Support Command. The division opened three seaports, two airports, three command posts, and convoy support centers along a 500-mile route from the Turkish coast, through Mardin, to the Northern Iraqi border. When the Turkish government voted to deny US ground forces access to Turkey, ARFOR-T collapsed the line of communication and redeployed to Germany home stations in April 2003.

1-63 Armor of the 3rd Brigade Combat Team deployed to Kirkuk, Iraq from Rose Barracks, Germany, during the first-ever deployment of the USAREUR (United States Army Europe) Immediate Ready Task Force (IRTF) in March 2003, in support of the 173rd Airborne Brigade. The battalion redeployed to Europe with the 173rd in March 2004.

The 1st Brigade, 1st Infantry Division deployed from Fort Riley, Kansas in September 2003 to provide support to the 82nd Airborne Division in the city of Ramadi, Iraq. In September 2004, the 1st Brigade was replaced by elements from the 2nd Infantry Division in Ramadi and redeployed to Ft. Riley.

In January 2004, the division less the 1st Brigade Combat Team deployed from home stations in Germany to Iraq, where it conducted an area relief with the 4th Infantry Division in the Salah ad-Din, Diyala, Kirkuk and Sulaymaniyah provinces, with the division headquarters located on Forward Operating Base Danger, in Saddam Hussein's hometown of Tikrit. Task Force Danger, as the division was called during OIF2, was augmented with the 2nd Brigade, 25th Infantry Division, the 30th Heavy Brigade Combat Team of the North Carolina Army National Guard, the 264th Engineer Group of the Wisconsin Army National Guard, the 167th Corps Support Group, 1st ROC (USAR), and the 2nd Battalion, 108th Infantry Regiment of the New York Army National Guard. The 2nd Brigade Combat Team was headquartered in Tikrit, the 3rd Brigade Combat Team was headquartered outside Baqubah, and the 30th BCT was headquartered in Kirkuk. The 4th Brigade and Division Support Command were based at Forward Operating Base Spiecher north of Tikrit. Task Force Danger conducted counterinsurgency operations, to include the full spectrum of combat, peace enforcement, training and equipping Iraqi security forces, support to Iraqi institutions to improve quality of life, and two national elections. Major combat included operations in Baqubah, Samarra, Bayji, Najaf, Al Diwaniyah, and Fallujah. In February 2005, the division facilitated an area relief with the 42d Infantry Division, New York National Guard, and elements of the 3rd Infantry Division and redeployed to home stations in Germany.

Rebasing to US
In July 2006 the division was withdrawn from Germany back to Fort Riley in CONUS, leaving only 2nd (Dagger) Brigade in Schweinfurt, Germany until 28 March 2008 when the 3rd Brigade, 1st Armored Division was reorganized and re-designated as the 2nd Brigade, 1st Infantry Division.

Iraq 2006–2008
The 2nd (Dagger) Brigade Combat Team deployed to Iraq from mid-August 2006 to late November 2007. 1st Battalion, 26th Infantry Regiment was the first to embark and was sent to the Adhamiya district of Baghdad to assist in suppressing the widespread sectarian violence. The 1st Battalion, 77th Armor Regiment was deployed to Ramadi and the 1st Battalion, 18th Infantry Regiment was sent to Forward Operating Base Falcon in the Al Rashid district of southwest Baghdad. HQ and HQ Company 2BCT, 1st ID, 9th Engineer Battalion, 1st Battalion, 7th Field Artillery Regiment, 299th Support Battalion, C/101 MI BN, and 57th Signal Company were all (Dagger) units occupying Camp Liberty, a sprawling encampment of 30,000+ military and DoD civilians located just east of Baghdad International Airport (BIAP). 2BCT MP PLT (formerly 2nd Platoon, 1st Military Police Company) was located at FOB (Forward Operating Base) Justice. During the 15-month deployment, 61 soldiers from the brigade were killed, including 31 from 1–26 infantry, which had the most casualties in any single battalion since the Vietnam War.

Elements from Fort Riley's 1st (Devil) Brigade deployed in the fall of 2006 to other area of operations in Iraq. Units include companies from the 1st Battalion, 16th Infantry; 1st Battalion, 34th Armor; 1st Battalion, 5th Field Artillery; 1st Engineer Battalion; and D Troop, 4th Cavalry.

Transition team training mission
State-side training for the military transition teams (MiTTs) is located at Fort Riley, Kansas. Training began 1 June 2006. Some of the units such as the 18th Infantry Regiment, the 26th Infantry Regiment, and the 16th Infantry Regiment have already gone into Afghanistan along with some reconnaissance units. Those units have been in the Kunar Province since mid-2006. As of fall 2009 the transition team training mission has moved to Fort Polk, and the 1st Brigade has transitioned into a combat ready force with possible plans to deploy in the next few years.

Iraq 2007

In February 2007, the 4th Infantry Brigade Combat Team deployed to southern Baghdad in support of Operation Iraqi Freedom. the second unit tasked with the "surge" announced earlier in the year by President Bush. The main force of the brigade was under Col "Ricky" Gibbs at FOB Falcon. 2nd Battalion, 16th Infantry was put under operational control of 2nd Brigade, 2nd Infantry Division, and located at FOB Rustamiyah (Featured in the Book "the Good Soldiers" by Washington Post reporter David Finkel)

In the fall of 2007, the Combat Aviation Brigade (Demon Brigade), 1st Infantry Division deployed to Iraq and was placed under the command of Multinational Division – North located at COB Spiecher. The majority of the CAB is stationed at COB Spiecher, with the 1st Squadron, 6th Cavalry Regiment and some supporting elements stationed at FOB Warrior.

Afghanistan 2008–2009
In June and July 2008, 3rd Brigade, "Duke", deployed to Eastern Afghanistan under the command of CJTF-101, relieving the 173rd Airborne Brigade and taking control of the Kunar, Nuristan, Nangarhar, and Laghman provinces. One of the brigades infantry battalions, 2nd Battalion, 2nd Infantry, was tasked out down south in the Kandahar province outside of the brigade command. The 6th Squadron, 4th Cavalry Regiment was tasked with securing the Kunar Valley. Combat Outposts Keating and Lowell were engaged in combat on nearly a daily basis while Observation Posts Hatchet and Mace disrupted Taliban supply lines and took the brunt of attacks from the east out of Pakistan. They were involved in the infamous Battle of Bari Alai, where 3 American soldiers and 2 Latvian soldiers were killed. The battle lasted over the course of 4 days where the fatigued soldiers of Charlie Troop and Hatchet Troop were continuously harassed by Taliban fighters after retaking the observation post. 6-4 Cavalry had the most casualties of the brigade with the exception of the 1st Battalion, 26th Infantry Regiment, who were continuously engaged with the Taliban in the Korengal Valley. CNN branded the brigade "The Dying Duke" because of the brutality and high casualty rate of the unit in their time in theater. Main focuses of the brigade and PRT were to protect population centers such as Jalalabad and Asadabad and help develop the local economy through the construction of roads, and provide security while doing so. The brigade returned to Ft. Hood, Texas in July 2009 after a year of combat in which they recorded over 2000 firefights, over 3000 enemy killed, over 1000 bombs dropped, 26,000 rounds of artillery fire and over 500 Purple Hearts awarded.

Iraq 2008–2009
In October 2008, the 2nd Heavy Brigade Combat Team deployed to northwest Baghdad in support of Operation Iraqi Freedom. The brigade HQ was located on VBC (Victory Base Complex) and the brigade was responsible for the NW quarter of Baghdad. During this deployment soldiers of the 1st CAB (Combined Arms Battalion), 18th Infantry Regiment were located on FOB Justice. The 1st CAB, 63rd Armor was initially located in Mah-Muh-Diyah (south of Baghdad) and then relocated to JSS Nasir wa Salam (NWS) in the Abu Ghraib area to the west of Baghdad. 5th Squadron, 4th Cavalry was located in the Ghazaliyah area of West Baghdad where they battled the 1920s Revolutionary Brigade and eventually wrested control of the area from them. The 1st Battalion, 7th Field Artillery was located on FOB Prosperity within the "Green Zone", and the 2nd Brigade Special Troops Battalion located in the Victory Base Complex. During this deployment, the 4th Squadron, 10th Cavalry, 2nd Battalion, 8th (US) Cavalry Regiment was attached to the brigade for several months, as well as the 1st Battalion, 41st Field Artillery, and a battalion from the 56th Stryker Brigade Combat Team (PAARNG).

The most notable events which occurred during this time were the Iraqi provincial elections, the expiration of the UN Mandate and the corresponding implementation of the security agreement (SA), between the Government of Iraq and the United States, and "Bloody Wednesday" 19 August 2009 coordinated bombing of the finance ministry and the foreign ministry, with rocket attacks in the green zone. The bombings resulted in 101 dead and over 560 wounded. The Dagger Brigade experienced constant, albeit minor, enemy contact during this deploymentalthough the brigade still had two KIAs (one serving as the brigade deputy commander's personal security detachment and one from the attached PAARNG battalion) and numerous WIA. During this deployment, LTC J.B. Richardson III (commander of 5–4 CAV) earned a Bronze Star for Valor for single-handedly assaulting through an enemy RKG-3 ambush and inflicting multiple casualties on the enemy.

Iraq 2009–2010
4th Infantry Brigade Combat Team (Dragons) deployed in August 2009 as one of the last combat units to be deployed to Iraq. Under the Command of Colonel Henry A. Arnold III. The Brigade experienced two casualties over the course of the deployment. Spc. Tony Carrasco Jr. Died 4 November 2009. 2nd Battalion 32nd Field Artillery. Spc. Jacob Dohrenwend. 21 June 2010. 1st Battalion 28th Infantry Regiment.

Iraq 2010–2011
1st Heavy Brigade Combat Team headquarters with their Brigade Support Battalion (BSB) and Special Troops Battalion deployed to Kirkuk, Iraq in October 2010 to establish the 1-1 Advise and Assist Task Force as part of Operation New Dawn. They were later joined by 1–5 Field Artillery in northern Iraq in late spring 2011.

2nd Heavy Brigade Combat Team deployed to Baghdad, Iraq in November 2010 in an advise and assist role as part of Operation New Dawn under the command of COL Paul T. Calvert. The brigade HQ was located at Victory Base Complex, where it was co-located within the USD-C Division HQ building and shared the same TOC. This unique C2 relationship earned the brigade the moniker of the "Luckiest Brigade in the Army" from the USD-C commander. The brigade was placed under USD-C (initially 1st AD, then 25th Infantry Division after Dec 2011) and was single-handedly responsible for the entire province of Baghdad. As the brigade responsible for the "center of gravity" (i.e. Baghdad) for United States Forces-Iraq, the 2nd "Dagger" Brigade was responsible for advising and assisting 50% of the Iraqi security forces within Iraq to include two Iraqi corps HQ (the Karkh Area Command and Rusafa Area Command) and seven Iraqi divisions (6th IA, 9th IA – Mechanized, 17th IA, 11th IA, 1st FP, 2nd FP, and 4th FP) and 50,000 Iraqi policemen.

The 1st Battalion, 18th Infantry Regiment, commanded by LTC John Cross, was located at Camp Taji and FOB Old MOD. They were partnered with the 9th and 11th IA Divisions. 1st Battalion, 7th FA, commanded by LTC Andrew Gainey, was located at JSS Loyalty. They were partnered with the 1st Federal Police Division. 1st Battalion, 63rd Armored, commanded by LTC Michael Henderson, was located at JSS Deason, Muthana Airfield, and VBC. They were partnered with the 6th and 17th IA Divisions. 5th Squadron, 4th Cavalry, commanded by LTC Mathew Moore was located at JSS Falcon. They were partnered with the 2nd and 4th FP Divisions. The Special Troops Battalion, commanded by LTC Shilisa Geter, was located at VBC (Victory Base Complex) and partnered with the Baghdad Police Directorate. Meanwhile, due to the drawdown of US forces and the redeployment of theater-level sustainment brigades, the 299th BSB, commanded by LTC Dale Farrand, assumed the area support mission for all DOD and DOS elements within the province of Baghdad in addition to supporting the Dagger Brigade.

Significant events during this deployment included the resumption of attacks by the Sadrist movement and other Iranian-backed militia, the subsequent operations that stopped those attacks, the rearward passage of lines of USD-North as they redeployed through Baghdad, the organization and training of divisional field artillery regiments for the IA divisions, the fielding of M1 tanks for the 9th IA Division, and the hand-over of all US facilities within Baghdad to the Government of Iraq or elements of the US State Department. During this deployment the brigade simultaneously trained ISF units to the point of conducting Iraqi-led battalion CALFEXs, advised ISF units as they conducted hundreds of Iraqi-led raids which disrupted the attacks of Iranian-backed militia, while also conducting unilateral and combined force protection operations to ensure the security of US bases and redeploying US forces. The brigade experienced nine KIAs during this deployment, the majority of which resulted from a single IRAM attack (improvised rocket-assisted munition) conducted against JSS Loyalty by Iranian-backed militia on 6 June 2011. The brigade departed Iraq in November 2011 after having turned the majority of the city of Baghdad over to complete Iraqi control.

Afghanistan 2011–2012
From 1st Heavy Brigade Combat Team, 1st Battalion, 16th Infantry (CAB) and 4th Squadron, 4th Cavalry deployed to Afghanistan in the winter of 2011, with 2nd Battalion, 34th Armor (CAB) later deploying in the spring of 2011. 1–16 IN (CAB) was assigned to support the combined joint special task force, the Iron Rangers were deployed to 58 remote locations across Afghanistan. They completed more than 10,000 missions as part of village stability operations with the Afghan people. The operations connected the government of Afghanistan to the village level and taught Afghans about their constitution. 2–34 AR (CAB) was deployed to Maiwand, Kandahar Province located southern Afghanistan near the Kandahar/Helmand Province border. 4-4 Cavalry was deployed to central Zhari District, Kandahar province and conducted thousands of combat patrols throughout the birthplace and homeland of the Taliban.

3rd Infantry Brigade Combat Team deployed to Khost and Paktya provinces in Eastern Afghanistan in January 2011. 2nd Battalion, 2nd Infantry Regiment was once again detached from the brigade and deployed to Ghazni province under Polish command. The brigade conducted Operations Tofan I and II. Tofan I's mission was to disrupt insurgent safe havens in the Musa Khel region of Khowst Province, improve the ability for the government to reach the people there and gather intelligence for planning future operations. Tofan II's mission was to establish contact with the insurgents, disrupt their logistics, and reduce any material or moral support from the local population. Movement to the extremely remote area, which featured narrow or non-existent roads set among mountains, included mounted and dismounted soldiers who also had to be aware of the need to control the key terrain features around Suri Kheyl.

Afghanistan 2012–2013
The 1st Infantry Division headquarters deployed to Bagram, Afghanistan on 19 April 2012 as part of Operation Enduring Freedom XIII after receiving responsibility for Regional Command (East)(RC(E)) from 1st Cavalry Division. The division served as the Combined Joint Task Force-1 (CJTF-1) and RC(E), command and controlling the vital region (Bamiyan, Parwan, Panjshayr, Kapisa, Laghman, Nuristan, Konar, Nangarhar, Maiden Wardak, Logar, Paktiya, Khowst, Ghazni, and Paktika) surrounding Kabul and a large portion of the volatile border with Pakistan. During the division's tenure in Afghanistan, the division oversaw a transition of authority to the Afghan National Security Forces (ANSF)201st Corps north of Kabul and had prepared the ANSF 203rd Corps to assume full security responsibility south of Kabul prior to transitioning RC(E) to 101st Airborne Division (AASLT).

The 4th IBCT deployed to Afghanistan in May 2012 for a 9-month deployment. The brigade operated in Ghazni and Paktika provinces in eastern Afghanistan. Dragon Brigade concluded its deployment in February 2013, transitioning oversight of Ghazni province to 1st Brigade, 10th Mountain Division and Paktika province to 2nd Brigade, 10th Mountain Division and full security responsibility for those provinces to 3rd and 2nd Brigades, ANSF 203rd Corps, respectively.

Operation Inherent Resolve
In response to the growing ISIL threat the Department of Defense announced on 25 September 2014 that approximately 500 soldiers from 1st Infantry Division Headquarters will be deployed to Iraq with the task of assisting Iraqi Security Forces. This will be the first Division HQ deployed in Iraq since withdrawal back in 2011. Among the soldiers sent over approximately 200 will be stationed in Baghdad, where they will make up close to half of US troops deployed.

In mid-October 2016 the US Army announced it will deploy about 500 soldiers from the 1st Infantry Division Headquarters to Iraq in the fall of 2016. Troops will assume the role of Combined Joint Forces Land Component Command-Iraq in support of Operation Inherent Resolve.

Operation Freedom's Sentinel
In late July 2016, the U.S. Army announced that it will send 800 soldiers from 1st Combat Aviation Brigade, 1st Infantry Division, to Afghanistan to support Operation Freedom's Sentinel – the U.S. counter-terrorism operation against the remnants of al-Qaeda, ISIS–K and other terror groups. The brigade will deploy with its AH-64 Apache attack helicopters and UH-60 Black Hawk utility helicopters sometime before October 2016.

Operation Atlantic Resolve
In April 2017, Military.com reported that approximately 4,000 soldiers from the 2nd Armored Brigade Combat Team, 1st Infantry Division will deploy to Europe as part of Operation Atlantic Resolve, replacing the 3rd Armored BCT, 4th Infantry Division in a regular rotation of forces. The unit deployed in September 2017 and redeployed in June 2018, serving throughout Eastern Europe conducting readiness and inter-operability training with NATO Allies to assure U.S. Allies and deter aggression. The Division Headquarters deployed part of its headquarters in March 2018 to Poznan, Poland, to serve as the U.S. Army Europe's Mission Command Element forward providing mission command of the Regionally Aligned Forces serving in Atlantic Resolve. They are scheduled to remain until June 2020. In January the division's 1st Armored Brigade Combat Team and 1st Combat Aviation Brigade deployed to Eastern Europe in Support of Operation Atlantic Resolve with the mission of building readiness, assuring Allies, and deterring aggression on the continent. The 1st Armored Brigade Combat Team deployed again to Operation Atlantic Resolve in July 2021. The Brigade’s deployment was extended indefinitely in response to the Russian invasion of Ukraine in February 2022.

Insignia

No credible source states how the insignia of the 1st Infantry Division originated in World War I. There are two theories as to how the idea of the patch came about. The first theory states that the 1st Division supply trucks were manufactured in England. To make sure the 1st Division's trucks were not confused with other allies, the drivers would paint a huge "1" on the side of each truck. Later, the division engineers would go even farther and put a red number one on their sleeves.

The second theory claims that a general of the division decided the unit should have a shoulder insignia. He decided to cut a red numeral "1" from his flannel underwear. When he showed his prototype to his men, one lieutenant said, "the general's underwear is showing!" Offended, the general challenged the young lieutenant to come up with something better. So, the young officer cut a piece of gray cloth from the uniform of a captured soldier, and placed the red "1" on top.

Music

Band
The 1st Infantry Division Band (abbreviated as the 1ID Band and often known as the Big Red One Band) is the musical ambassador for the division that performs for military ceremonies at Fort Riley and the surrounding communities in the Midwest. The 38-member band contains the Concert Wind Ensemble, the Marching Band, a Seated Ceremonial Band as well as other specialized ensembles. The band was notably involved in the Thunder Road incident in Vietnam, during which Major General John Hay ordered the band to march down "Thunder Road", for one mile while playing the Colonel Bogey March. The road, which was critical to the division's operations, was under the control of a North Vietnamese Army regiment. Confused by the action, the regiment withdrew from the area, with the band fulfilling a remarkable combat mission without firing a shot. In 2008, a parachutist injured three members of the band after crashing into them following getting off course during military review.

Song

According to the 1st Infantry Division history, the song was composed in 1943 by Captain Donald T. Kellett, who retired after a 30-year career as a colonel and died in 1991. Later revised from "Men of a great division" to "Soldiers of a great division".

Current structure

1st Infantry Division consists of the following elements: a division headquarters and headquarters battalion, two armored brigade combat teams, a division artillery, a combat aviation brigade, a sustainment brigade, and a combat sustainment support battalion.  The field artillery battalions remain attached to their brigade combat teams.
 Division Headquarters and Headquarters Battalion
  Headquarters and Support Company
  Signal, Intelligence and Sustainment Company
  1st Infantry Division Band
  Commanding General's Mounted Color Guard
  19th Public Affairs Detachment
 1st Armored Brigade Combat Team (1st ABCT) (Devil Brigade)
  Headquarters and Headquarters Company (HHC)
  1st Squadron, 4th Cavalry Regiment Quarter-horse
  1st Battalion, 16th Infantry Regiment Iron Rangers
  2nd Battalion, 34th Armor Regiment Dreadnaughts
  3rd Battalion, 66th Armor Regiment Burt's Knights
  1st Battalion, 5th Field Artillery Regiment (FAR) Hamilton's Own
  1st Brigade Engineer Battalion (BEB) Diehards
  101st Brigade Support Battalion (BSB) Liberty
 2nd Armored Brigade Combat Team (Dagger Brigade)
  HHC
  5th Squadron, 4th Cavalry Regiment
  1st Battalion, 18th Infantry Regiment Vanguards
  1st Battalion, 63rd Armor Regiment Dragons
  2nd Battalion, 70th Armor Regiment Thunder Bolts
  1st Battalion, 7th FAR First Lightning
  82nd BEB
  299th BSB Lifeline
 1st Infantry Division Artillery
  Headquarters and Headquarters Battery
 1st Infantry Division, Combat Aviation Brigade (Demon Brigade)
  HHC
  1st Battalion (Attack), 1st Aviation Regiment with 24 AH-64D Apache Longbows
  1st Squadron, 6th Cavalry Regiment with 24 AH-64D and 12 RQ-7 Shadows. The Fighting Sixth
  2nd Battalion (General Support), 1st Aviation Regiment with 8 UH-60L Black Hawks, 12 CH-47F Chinooks and 15 HH-60M Black Hawks
  3rd Battalion (Assault), 1st Aviation Regiment with 30 UH-60M Black Hawks
  601st Aviation Support Battalion
1st Infantry Division Sustainment Brigade
  Special Troops Battalion
  HHC
  267th Signal Company
  541st Division Sustainment Support Battalion
  HHC
  1st Maintenance Company (Support)
  24th Transportation Company (Composite Truck)
  165th Movement Control Team (MCT)
  266th MCT
  526th Quartermaster Company (Composite Supply)

Awards and decorations
Source:

Campaign credit

Unit decorations

See also
 Division insignia of the United States Army
 The Big Red One (1980), a movie about the division's experiences in World War II written by Samuel Fuller, who served in the division during World War II.
 1st Infantry Division Museum
 Cantigny, the former estate of Col. Robert R. McCormick, is where the 1st Infantry Division Museum at Cantigny is located. The museum showcases the history of the 1st Infantry Division, from their involvement in World War I to the present, along with several tanks situated outside the museum dating from World War I to the present.
 Iraq Assistance Group, a former joint command coordinating the coalition military transition team mission in Iraq which was formed from the 1st Infantry Division.
 Call of Duty 2: Big Red One, an expansion for the first-person shooter video game Call of Duty 2 with a focus on the division's operations in World War II.
 Call of Duty: WWII has players take on the role of Ronald "Red" Daniels, a private and part of "The Bloody First", following the operations of the division from the D-Day landings, up to the capture of the Rhineland.

Explanatory notes

References

 Office of the Theater Historian 1948, Order of Battle of the United States Army World War II Divisions 1945, Paris.

Further reading
 
 Felix G. Third Graders at War: The True Story of a Cavalry Scout During Operation Desert Storm, 
 Rohan, John. Rags, the Dog Who Went to War, Diggory Press, 
 Gantter, Raymond. Roll Me Over: An Infantryman's World War II, Ivy Books, 
 Stanton, Shelby, Vietnam Order of Battle: A Complete Illustrated Reference to the U.S. Army and Allied Ground Forces in Vietnam, 1961–1973, Stackpole Books, 2006 
 Wheeler, James Scott. The Big Red One: America's Legendary 1st Infantry Division from World War I to Desert Storm (2nd ed., University Press of Kansas, 2007), the standard history; 710pp
 Desert Redleg: Artillery Warfare in the First Gulf War by Col. L. Scott Lingamfelter

External links

 Official 1st Infantry Division website
 Society of the First Infantry Division
 Duty First: The 1st Infantry Division's award-winning quarterly magazine
 First Division Museum at Cantigny Park
 The First! The Story of the 1st Infantry Division (World War II divisional history booklet, 1945)
 Echoes of War: Stories from the Big Red One Interactive PBS documentary about the 1st Infantry Div.
 1st Infantry Division Living History Group – Germany
 Cantigny First Division Oral Histories, includes freely accessible video oral history interviews with veterans of the U.S. Army's First Infantry Division

 Media
 
 
 
 
 
 
 
 
 

001st Infantry Division, U.S.
Military units and formations established in 1917
Military units and formations in Kansas
Military units and formations of the United States in the Gulf War
001st Infantry Division
Infantry Division, U.S. 001st
Infantry divisions of the United States Army in World War II
01